This is a list of British television related events from 1957.

Events

January
No events.

February
16 February – The "Toddlers' Truce" (an arrangement whereby there were no television broadcasts between 6pm and 7pm, to allow parents to put their children to bed) is abolished - it has been a major stumbling block to the success of ITV.

March
3 March – The United Kingdom enters the Eurovision Song Contest for the first time with All performed by Patricia Bredin.

April
1 April – British current affairs programme Panorama broadcasts the famous Spaghetti trees hoax report.
21 April – Historical documentary series Men, Women and Clothes begins airing. It is the first BBC programme filmed in colour, although it can only be transmitted in black and white.
24 April – The Sky at Night appears for the first time, presented by Patrick Moore. It continues to air with Moore as presenter until his death in December 2012.

May
No events.

June
No events.

July
No events.

August
31 August – Central Scotland's ITV franchise Scottish Television goes on air, the first 7-day-a-week ITV franchise to do so.

September
September – The first broadcasts of regional news bulletins take place.
18 September – The sports programme Scotsport begins airing on Scottish Television. By the time it ends in 2008 it is recognised as the world's longest running television sports magazine.
24 September – The ITV Schools and BBC Schools services, broadcasting programmes for schools and colleges, both go on air.
30 September – Regional television news bulletins for the north of England begin from Piccadilly's studio N in Manchester.

October
No events.

November
No events.

December
3 December – Face to Face debuts on the BBC Television Service.
25 December – The Royal Christmas Message is first televised with a message from Elizabeth II.

Debuts

BBC Television Service/BBC TV
 2 January – Potts and the Phantom Piper (1957)
 3 January –  Our Miss Pemberton  (1957–1958)
 13 January – The Adventures of Peter Simple (1957)
 17 January – My Pal Bob (1957–1958)
8 February – Kenilworth (1957)
16 February – Six-Five Special (1957–1958)
18 February – Tonight (1957–1965)
22 February – On Safari (1957–1965)
3 March – The Railway Children (1957)
28 March – The Wharf Road Mob (1957)
9 April – Portraits of Power (1957–1958)
17 April – Lenny the Lion Show (1957–1960)
20 April – The Phil Silvers Show (1955–1959)
24 April – The Sky at Night (1957–present)
25 April – Alma Cogan Show (1957; 1962)
30 April –  Sara Crewe (1957)
6 May – Drake's Progress  (1957–1958)
12 May – The Kilt Is My Delight (1957–1963)
19 May – The Machine Breakers (1957)
29 May –Precious Bane (1957)
2 June – From Me to You (1957)
13 June –  Sheep's Clothing (1957)
16 June –  Huntingtower (1957)
22 July –  Scott Free (1957)
27 July – Escape (1957)
28 July – A Tale of Two Cities (1957)
4 September – Mister Charlesworth (1957)
2 October – Educated Evans (1957–1958)
12 October –  Thunder in the West (1957)
16 October – The Royalty (1957–1958)
18 October – Nicholas Nickelby (1957)
25 October – Be Soon (1957)
13 November A Time of Day (1957)
24 November – The Silver Sword (1957)
7 December 
 Angel Pavement (1957–1958)
 Caxton's Tales (1957–1958)
15 December – The Trial of Mary Lafarge (1957)
Unknown 
Captain Pugwash (BBC 1957–1966; 1974–1975, ITV 1997–2002)
Pinky and Perky (1957–1968)

ITV
2 January – The Arthur Haynes Show (1957–1966)
26 January – The Man Who Was Two (1957)
11 February – Yes, It's the Cathode-Ray Tube Show! (1957)
19 February – Emergency – Ward 10 (1957–1967)
9 March – The Gentle Killers (1957)
14 March – Jim's Inn (1957–1963)
19 March – Roving Report (1957–1964)
5 April – Together Again (1957)
9 April – The Adventures of Long John Silver (1957)
12 April – Living It Up (1957–1958)
20 April – Electrode 93 (1957)
25 April – Hawkeye and the Last of the Mohicans (1957)
15 June 
 Hour of Mystery  (1957)
 Motive for Murder (1957)
  Overseas Press Club - Exclusive! (1957)
17 June – Shadow Squad (1957–1959)
19 June – The Army Game (1957–1961)
12 July – The Gay Cavalier (1957)
3 August –  The Schirmer Inheritance (1957)
5 August – Highland Fling (1957)
7 August – Dead Giveaway (1957)
9 August – The New Adventures of Charlie Chan (1957–1958)
14 September –  Five Names for Johnny (1957)
16 September – Murder Bag (1957–1958)
17 September – Chelsea at Nine (1957–1960)
18 September – Out of Step (1957)
 22 September – O.S.S. (1957–1958)
 12 October – White Hunter (1957–1959)
 13 November – The Adventures of Twizzle (1957–1959)
 21 December – Web (1957)
Unknown 
Alfred Hitchcock Presents (1955–1965)
Criss Cross Quiz (1957–1967)
Mark Saber (1955–1960)
The Adventures of a Jungle Boy (1957)

STV
18 September – Scotsport (1957–2008)

Continuing television shows

1920s
BBC Wimbledon (1927–1939, 1946–2019, 2021–2024)

1930s
The Boat Race (1938–1939, 1946–2019)
BBC Cricket (1939, 1946–1999, 2020–2024)

1940s
Come Dancing (1949–1998)

1950s
Andy Pandy (1950–1970, 2002–2005)
What's My Line? (1951–1963)
Flower Pot Men (1952–1958, 2001–2002)
All Your Own (1952–1961)
Watch with Mother (1952–1975) 
Rag, Tag and Bobtail (1953–1965)
The Good Old Days (1953–1983)
Panorama (1953–present)
The Woodentops (1955–1958)
The Adventures of Robin Hood (1955–1960)
Picture Book (1955–1965)
Sunday Night at the London Palladium (1955–1967, 1973–1974)
Take Your Pick! (1955–1968, 1992–1998)
Double Your Money (1955–1968)
Dixon of Dock Green (1955–1976)
Crackerjack (1955–1984, 2020–present)
Hancock's Half Hour (1956–1961)
Opportunity Knocks (1956–1978, 1987–1990)
This Week (1956–1978, 1986–1992)
Armchair Theatre (1956–1974)
What the Papers Say (1956–2008)

Ending this year
 The Appleyards (1952–1957)
 The Grove Family (1954–1957)
 The Adventures of Aggie (1956–1957)
 The Tony Hancock Show (1956–1957)
 The Adventures of Sir Lancelot (1956–1957)

Births
 17 January – Keith Chegwin, presenter (d. 2017)
 24 January – Ade Edmondson, comedian
 27 February – Timothy Spall, actor
 5 May – Richard E. Grant, actor
 11 May – Mike Nesbitt, broadcast journalist and politician
 4 June – Sue Hodge, actress
 4 July – Jenny Seagrove, actress
 9 July – Paul Merton, actor and comedian
 12 July – Christopher Quinten, actor
 17 July – Fern Britton, presenter
 23 July – Jo Brand, comedian
 12 August – Amanda Redman, actress
 24 August – Stephen Fry, comedian, presenter, actor and author
 12 September – Rachel Ward, actress
 11 October – Dawn French, comedienne and actress 
 24 October – Sarah Greene, presenter
 17 November – Debbie Thrower, presenter
 30 November – Colin Mochrie, comedian
 23 December – Trisha Goddard, presenter
 26 December – Dermot Murnaghan, journalist and presenter

Deaths
 7 August – Oliver Hardy, part of Laurel and Hardy, aged 65

See also
 1957 in British music
 1957 in the United Kingdom
 List of British films of 1957

References